The Myanmar Trade Office, The Republic of the Union of Myanmar is the representative office of Myanmar in Taiwan. This bureau functions as a de facto embassy while diplomatic relations are absent between Naypyitaw and Taipei. It was established in June 2015.

Its counterpart in Myanmar is the Taipei Economic and Cultural Office in Myanmar in Yangon. Taiwan External Trade Development Council established a trade mission in Yangon in November 2013.

The office was closed in 2022.

See also 
 List of diplomatic missions in Taiwan
 List of diplomatic missions of Myanmar
 Myanmar–Taiwan relations

References

External links 
 Myanmar Trade Office (Taipei)

Diplomatic missions of Myanmar
Representative Offices in Taipei
Myanmar–Taiwan relations
Organizations established in 2015